Amy C. Clement is an atmospheric and marine scientist studying and modeling global climate change at the University of Miami's Rosenstiel School of Marine and Atmospheric Science.

Her research focuses on cloud albedo feedbacks, ocean circulation patterns, and the El Niño Southern Oscillation (ENSO).

Early life
Clement was born in Boston and moved to Long Island shortly thereafter, where she spent most of her adolescent life.

Education
Clement attended Columbia College where she received a B.A. in physics. She received her Ph.D from the Earth and Environmental Science program at Columbia University. Her studies continued at the University of Pierre and Marie Currie in Paris, where she conducted her postdoctoral work.

Career and research 
Clement is a climate scientist studying atmospheric and oceanic interactions related to climate change. She studies the physics of climate modeling, and seeks to understand the mechanisms of climate change to refine a global climate model. Clement is currently a professor at University of Miami's Rosenstiel School of Marine and Atmospheric Sciences. She is involved in a long term project focused on understanding the importance of tropical regions in paleoclimate for her global climate model. One of Clements primary research topics focuses on the role of the cloud albedo feedback in a warming climate. Her studies examine low-altitude clouds, which are capable of reflecting incoming solar radiation back into space. She studies the relationship between the cover of these clouds and the rate of warming to examine the role of clouds. Clements findings support this theory in that as climate and oceans warm, low laying clouds form less frequently, which lowers the albedo of the earth (more infrared radiation is absorbed rather than reflected), leading to a warmer climate with less clouds. As most in of her research, these findings support a positive feedback warming cycle in climate. Additionally, Clement has conducted significant research on the El Niño Southern Oscillation (ENSO), which is known to play a large role in the climate system. Clement and her researchers somewhat controversially suggest that atmospheric and ocean dynamics need not be connected in order to understand tropical climate and their associated global patterns.

She was awarded the James B Macelwane Medal in 2007. The Macelwane Medal is presented to young scientists who has made significant contributions in the realm of geophysical sciences. Clement was nominated for this award because of her research in tropical atmospheric and ocean dynamics. In conducting this research, she focused on how the atmosphere and ocean interact with both orbital changes and the thermohaline circulation system.

Significant publications 

 Orbital controls on the El Nino/Southern Oscillation and the tropical climate, Paleoceanography, 1999 
The Atlantic Multidecadal Oscillation without a role for ocean circulation, Science, 2015
An Ocean Dynamical Thermostat, Journal of Climate, 1996
Observational and Model Evidence for Positive Low-Level Cloud Feedback, Science 2009

Awards and honors 
Clement has earned several awards throughout her career for her intellectual leadership and mentoring success.

 Fellow of the American Meteorological Society
 Fellow to the American Geophysical Union
 AMS Clarence Leroy Meisinger Award
 AGU James B. Macelwane Medal in 2007  
 Rosenstiel School Outstanding Faculty Mentor Award (2015), because of her dedication to encouraging students to think more critically and creatively about fundamental climate processes.

Other interests 
Clement practices surfing in Miami, Florida. Additionally, Clement is part of a public research group involving students from University of Miami. Clement is now married and has two children.

References 

American atmospheric scientists
Women atmospheric scientists
American climatologists
Women climatologists
University of Miami faculty
Columbia College (New York) alumni
Fellows of the American Geophysical Union
People from Boston
Living people
Year of birth missing (living people)
Fellows of the American Meteorological Society